Armed Forces Football Club, commonly known as Armed Forces, is a Malaysian professional football club representing the Malaysian Armed Forces. The club's home ground is Mindef Stadium. The club currently plays in the 2nd division of Malaysian football, the Malaysia M3 League.

History

Armed Forces had their first major success in the 1997 season, when they won the Malaysia FAM Cup. Domestically, Armed Forces have won the numerous Malaysia football tournaments, most notably 3 times runners-up in Malaysia Cups, 1 Malaysia Charity Shield and 1 Malaysian League Division II title in 2012.

Crest

Honours

Domestic competitions

League
 Premier League
 Winners (1): 2012

Cups
 Malaysia Cup
 Runners-up (3): 1949, 1966, 2012
 FAM Cup
 Winners (2): 1958, 1997
 Runners-up (2): 1954, 2006
 Sultan Haji Ahmad Shah Cup
  Winner (1): 2013

Season by season record

Kit manufacturer and shirt sponsor

Players

First-team squad

Club officials

Coaches

Affiliated clubs
  Tentera Darat FA|Tentera Darat
  Royal Malaysian Navy
  RMAF Hornet
  Royal Malay Force Regiment FC
  Polis Diraja Malaysia FC

References

External links
 Official website (archived)

 
Malaysia Premier League clubs
Football clubs in Malaysia
Malaysia M3 League
Military association football clubs in Malaysia